Vytenis Čižauskas (born September 16, 1992) is a Lithuanian professional basketball player for Boulazac Basket Dordogne of the LNB Pro B. He plays the point guard position.

Career

From an early age, Čižauskas played for the Žalgiris youth team. In his second season, he led the team in points and assists; as a consequence, he was promoted to Kaunas Triobet of BBL.

In March 2009, he was moved to Žalgiris' main roster; however, the young point guard saw limited playing time in the LKL. After leaving Žalgiris, Čižauskas played for various local Lithuanian team until joining CB Valladolid of Liga ACB on loan from Žalgiris. He averaged a mediocre 2.6 points per game and 0.8 assists per game coming off the bench.

In September 2013, he returned to Žalgiris and debuted in the Euroleague tournament. On December 9, 2014 he signed with Latvian team BK Valmiera.

On January 1, 2022, he has signed with Boulazac Basket Dordogne of the LNB Pro B.

International career
He won five gold medals with Lithuania national teams: European Youth Summer Olympic Festival (U-15) and was named MVP in 2007, Europe U-16 in 2008, Europe U-18 in 2010, World U-19 in 2011 and Europe U-20 in 2012. He was a candidate for Lithuania national basketball team, which participated in EuroBasket 2013.

References

External links
Profile at ACB.com

1992 births
Living people
BC Lietkabelis players
BC Nevėžis players
BC Prienai players
BC Žalgiris players
BC Žalgiris-2 players
BK Valmiera players
Boulazac Basket Dordogne players
CB Valladolid players
Crailsheim Merlins players
Korvpalli Meistriliiga players
Liga ACB players
Lithuanian expatriate basketball people in Estonia
Lithuanian expatriate basketball people in Germany
Lithuanian expatriate basketball people in Spain
Lithuanian expatriate basketball people in Turkey
Lithuanian men's basketball players
LSU-Atletas basketball players
People from Kaišiadorys
Point guards
University of Tartu basketball team players